Major General Frank Long Winn (4 October 1864 – 24 February 1941) was a United States Army officer who commanded the 177th Infantry Brigade and the 89th Division in France during the final months of World War I.

Early life and education
Winn was born and raised in Winchester, Kentucky. He studied at Centre College in Danville, Kentucky for a year before entering the United States Military Academy in July 1882. Winn graduated in July 1886 and was commissioned as an infantry officer. Many of his classmates became general officers later. For example: John J. Pershing, Avery D. Andrews, Chauncey B. Baker, Charles C. Ballou, Malvern H. Barnum, Jesse McI. Carter, George B. Duncan, William H. Hay, Arthur Johnson, Albert D. Kniskern, Edward M. Lewis, Frank McIntyre, John E. McMahon, James McRae, Charles T. Menoher, Thomas B. Mott, Henry C. Newcomer, Mason Patrick, Julius Penn, Benjamin A. Poore, Thomas H. Rees, Peter E. Traub, Walter Henry Gordon and Charles C. Walcutt Jr.. He later attended the Field Officers' Course at the Army School of the Line from January to April 1915 and graduated from the Army War College in May 1916.

Military career
Winn served with the 1st Infantry in Nevada and California until April 1893. He was sent to South Dakota with the regiment in 1890 during the Pine Ridge Campaign.

Winn was assigned to the 12th Infantry from April 1893 to June 1909. From August 1893 to August 1897, he taught military science and tactics at the University of California, Berkeley. His regiment was sent to Cuba during the Spanish–American War and Winn was later awarded the Silver Star for his actions at El Caney on 1 July 1898.

After a few months back in the United States, his regiment sailed for the Philippines in February 1899. He was later awarded a second Silver Star for his actions on Luzon at Angeles on 16 August 1899. Winn remained in the Philippines until September 1901. Returning to California, he participated in the relief efforts after the 1906 San Francisco earthquake and fires.

On 5 June 1909, Winn was promoted to major and assigned to the 13th Infantry until February 1915. He returned to the Philippines from May 1912 to September 1914. On 7 February 1915, Winn was promoted to lieutenant colonel and assigned to the 16th Infantry until June 1916. He participated in the Mexican Punitive Expedition from May 1916 to February 1917. On 1 July 1916, Winn was promoted to colonel and given command of the 24th Infantry Regiment in Mexico and New Mexico until July 1917, three months after the American entry into World War I.

On 27 August 1917, Winn accepted a temporary promotion to brigadier general and assumed command of the 177th Infantry Brigade at Camp Funston in Kansas. He also spent a significant amount of his time from November 1917 to September 1918 serving as acting commander of the 89th Division. After his troops completed their training, they arrived in France in June 1918. In September of that year, Major General William M. Wright assumed command of the 89th Division and their troops were engaged in combat until the Armistice with Germany. On 14 October 1918, Winn accepted a temporary promotion to major general and assumed command of the 89th Division on the day after the Armistice. He returned to the United States with the division in May 1919 and the division was demobilized in June 1919. Winn was awarded the Army Distinguished Service Medal for his World War I service. The citation for the medal reads:

On 31 July 1919, Winn reverted to his permanent rank of colonel. He was given command of the 37th Infantry Regiment, holding this position from September 1919 to August 1920. On 10 October 1921, Winn accepted a promotion to brigadier general. He commanded the 4th Coast Artillery District from January to December 1922 and also the 8th Infantry Brigade from October to November 1922. On 4 December 1922, Winn accepted a promotion to major general and retired from active duty on the following day.

Family and later life
Winn married Dora Boardman (29 October 1867 – 23 December 1891) on 5 November 1890, in San Francisco. She died six days after the birth of their only child, a daughter. Winn later remarried with Katharine McCord (8 June 1872 – 2 March 1969) on 15 October 1910, in Milwaukee.

After retirement, Winn and his second wife settled in San Francisco. After a few years, they moved first to Saratoga, California and then to Palo Alto, California. After his death in Palo Alto, he was buried at Arlington National Cemetery on 9 April 1941.

Bibliography

References

|-

1864 births
1941 deaths
People from Winchester, Kentucky
Centre College alumni
United States Military Academy alumni
Military personnel from Kentucky
United States Army personnel of the Indian Wars
University of California, Berkeley faculty
American military personnel of the Spanish–American War
Recipients of the Silver Star
American military personnel of the Philippine–American War
United States Army Command and General Staff College alumni
United States Army War College alumni
United States Army generals of World War I
Recipients of the Distinguished Service Medal (US Army)
United States Army generals
People from San Francisco
People from Saratoga, California
People from Palo Alto, California
Burials at Arlington National Cemetery